is a Prefectural Natural Park in southeast Yamaguchi Prefecture, Japan. Established in 1962, the park spans the borders of the municipalities of Hikari, Shūnan, and Tabuse.

See also
 National Parks of Japan

References

Parks and gardens in Yamaguchi Prefecture
Hikari, Yamaguchi
Shūnan, Yamaguchi
Tabuse, Yamaguchi
Protected areas established in 1962
1962 establishments in Japan